Burrage Pond Wildlife Management Area (or BPWMA) is located in the towns of Hanson and Halifax in Massachusetts, USA. Hunting is permitted except on Sundays. BPWMA is made up mainly of swampy lands, old cranberry bogs (formally Bog 18, the biggest in the world), and cedar forest. It is managed by the Massachusetts Department of Fisheries and Wildlife.

References

External links
Description from North and South Rivers Watershed Association
Trail map
MassWildlife Lands Viewer (use search box to zoom to property)
Town of Halifax
Facebook page

Protected areas of Plymouth County, Massachusetts
Wildlife refuges in Massachusetts
Natural history of Massachusetts
Halifax, Massachusetts
Hanson, Massachusetts